Wiscon is an unincorporated community and census-designated place in Hernando County, Florida, United States. Its population was 681 as of the 2020 census. Florida State Road 50 passes through the community.

Geography
Wiscon is located near the center of Hernando County and is bordered by Spring Hill to the south and South Brooksville to the east. Florida State Road 50 runs through the CDP, leading east  to Brooksville, the county seat, and west  to U.S. Route 19 at Weeki Wachee.

Demographics

References

Unincorporated communities in Hernando County, Florida
Unincorporated communities in Florida
Census-designated places in Hernando County, Florida
Census-designated places in Florida